The 65th Carnatic Infantry were an infantry regiment of the British Indian Army. They could trace their origins to 1759, when they were raised as the 6th Battalion Coast Sepoys.

The regiment took part in the Carnatic Wars in 1746–1763 and then the Third Anglo-Mysore War.
They were disbanded in 1904.

Predecessor names
6th Battalion Coast Sepoys - 1759

References

Moberly, F.J. (1923). Official History of the War: Mesopotamia Campaign, Imperial War Museum. 

British Indian Army infantry regiments
Military history of the Madras Presidency
Military units and formations established in 1759
Military units and formations disestablished in 1904